Maalan is a locality in the Tablelands Region, Queensland, Australia.

Geography 
Maalan is a rural locality predominantly used for dairy farming which occurs in the valley areas (elevation approximately 900–1000 metres above sea level). In the west of the locality is the Cardwell Range with peaks to 1170 metres; part of this land is within the Tully Falls National Park. In the north is the Maalan National Park.

Maalan Road is the main route through the locality.

History 
In 1950 the Millaa Millaa branch of the Queensland Dairymen's Association proposing opening up the land in Maalan for farming. The Minister for Lands responded that the land had valuable cabinet timbers which would be sold and removed before opening up the land for sale. In June 1952 the Surveyor General of Queensland, John Percival Harvey, inspected the area. In November 1952, the Queensland Government proposed releasing  of land in Maalan.

In April 1953, 36 blocks each of approximately 240 acres were sold to intending dairy farmers. In September 1953 the selectors were busy clearing the land with a number of them already living on their blocks. In October 1953 the Maalan settlers met to negotiate a route for the supply of their milk and cream to the factory at Millaa Millaa. In November 1953 a bush fire brigade was formed at Maalan. In April 1954, the Maalan settlers were praised for their efforts in pioneering this new district. In November 1954 plans to commence dairying in the district were delayed by a plague of grasshoppers which ate the newly established dairy pastures.

References

Further reading

External links

Tablelands Region
Localities in Queensland